Bingöl Airport  is an airport located in Çeltiksuyu, 20 km away to the south-east of the city of Bingöl, in the Bingöl Province of Turkey. It was inaugurated in July 2013 by prime minister Recep Tayyip Erdoğan. It has a passenger capacity of 500'000 a year.

Airlines and destinations

Statistics

References

External links
 http://gc.kls2.com/airport/BGG
 https://airportsinsider.com/bgg-bingol-airport
 http://www.airporthaber.com/havacilik-haberleri/bingol-havalimani-aciliyor.html
 https://web.archive.org/web/20160304054824/http://www.dhmi.gov.tr/haberler.aspx?HaberID=1735

Airports in Turkey
Buildings and structures in Bingöl Province
Transport in Bingöl Province